'Jabal Omar (جبل عمر ) is a neighbourhood located in Makkah, Saudi Arabia south of the Al Haram district.

Description 
Jabal Omar is named for the hill Mount Omar that traditionally stood on the southern outskirts of  Mecca and currently consists of a group of old housing units that were built randomly over the years. 
There are currently no facilities in the Jabal Omar area, especially sanitation facilities. However, in late 2006, a clearance program was begun in Jabal Omar to provide the necessary space for the establishment of the Jabal Omar project. 

Jabal Omar is in the Sub Municipality of Ajyad (بلدية أجياد).

References

Neighborhoods of Mecca